Association Sportive Police, commonly known as AS Police, is a basketball club based in Bamako, Mali. The team plays in the Ligue 1. The roster mainly consists of civilians from N'Tomikorobougou, a neighborhood in Bamako, and police officers.

The team has known recent success, winning the national championship in 2017, 2019, 2020, 2021. The Police was one of the twelve teams that played in the inaugural season of the Basketball Africa League.

History
In 2019, Police won its second Malian national championship. Under head coach Moussa Sogoré, the team went unbeaten (9–0) on its way to its maiden title. By winning this title, Police earned the right to play in the 2020 BAL qualifiers. In the first round, the team finished first in Group A and advanced to the second round after upsetting GS Pétroliers. 

On 1 December 2019, the Police qualified for the inaugural Basketball Africa League (BAL) season after winning the third place game over ABC. The Police played the regular season of the tournament in Kigali and finished in the fourth and last place in Group B. Nigerian forward Jawachi Nzeakor led the team in scoring with 21 points per game. Center Ibrahima Thomas led the league in rebounding with 12 rebounds per game.

In the 2020–21 season, Police won its third consecutive Malian title after defeating Attar Club the finals.

Players

Current roster
The following is the AS Police roster for the second round of the 2022 BAL qualification:

Past rosters
2021 BAL season

Honours

In BAL competitions
AS Police has played three games in the main Basketball Africa League tournaments, losing all three games in 2021.

References

External links
AS Police at Afrobasket.com

Basketball teams in Mali
Sport in Bamako
Basketball Africa League teams
Road to BAL teams